Richard Symonds (born 21 November 1959) is a former professional footballer. He played 63 times for Norwich City before moving into non-league football.

Sources

http://www.neilbrown.newcastlefans.com/norwich/norwich.html

1959 births
Living people
English footballers
Association football defenders
Norwich City F.C. players
English Football League players
Place of birth missing (living people)